Akash Pandurang Fundkar is a member of the 13th Maharashtra Legislative Assembly. He represents the Khamgaon Assembly Constituency. He belongs to the Bharatiya Janata Party. He is the son of BJP politician Pandurang Pundalik Fundkar.

Within BJP

State Vice President, Maharashtra BJYM (2009-2014)

References

Maharashtra MLAs 2014–2019
People from Buldhana district
Marathi politicians
Bharatiya Janata Party politicians from Maharashtra
Living people
1983 births
Maharashtra MLAs 2019–2024